Chinyere Almona is the head of the Africa Corporate Governance Advisory Program of the International Finance Corporation (IFC).

She became the Director General, Lagos Chamber of Commerce and Industry on 1 July 2021 with the retirement of Dr. Muda Yusuf.

External link

References 

People from Abia State

Year of birth missing (living people)
Living people
Nigerian women business executives
Place of birth missing (living people)
21st-century Nigerian businesspeople